Ludovic Navarre (born 10 April 1969), known by his stage name St Germain, is a French musician. His style has been described as being a combination of house and nu jazz music.

Career
Navarre's album Boulevard was released in July 1995 and has sold over one million copies worldwide. His United States debut, Tourist, was released in 2000 and sold 300,000 copies in the USA and four million copies worldwide. Bob Marley, Toots & the Maytals, Miles Davis and Kool and the Gang are among Ludovic's early influences. He composed his first work under the name of Sub System with friend Guy Rabiller. He has released EPs under a number of aliases, among them Deepside, LN'S, Modus Vivendi, Nuages and Soofle.

St Germain is not associated with the Saint-Germain-des-Prés Café compilation series, though his song "Deep in It" is featured on its "Volume 1".

His song "Rose Rouge" was featured in the official movie trailer for Joss Whedon's 2013 Much Ado About Nothing.

His eponymous album, released on 9 October 2015, was recorded with the participation of African musicians, the album features traditional Malian instruments such as kora, balafon and ngoni, that mingle with electric guitars, pianos, saxophones and electronic loops. The first single, “Real Blues”, sets the voice of Lightnin' Hopkins to the beat of wild, fiery drums and percussion.

The original single sleeve is decorated with a 3D mask conceived by Urban Art creator Gregos, known for his smiling and frowning faces stuck on walls throughout Paris and Europe.

St Germain was included in the line-up for Coachella Valley Music and Arts Festival 2016.

Discography

Albums

Singles/EPs
St Germain
 1993: French Traxx EP
 1993: Motherland EP
 1994: Mezzotinto EP
 1995: "Alabama Blues"
 1996: "Muse Q The Music" (with Shazz and Derek Bays)
 1996: "Alabama Blues (Revisited)"
 2000: "Sure Thing"
 2000: "Rose Rouge" ('I want you to get together') (Peaks: FR: #97, NED:#86)
 2001: "Sure Thing Revisited"
 2001: "Rose Rouge Revisited"
 2001: "So Flute"
 2002: "Chaos"
 2004: Mezzotinto EP (re-release)
 2015: "Real Blues" (Peaks: FR: #129)
 
Deepside/D.S.
 1992: Seclude EP (with Guy Rabiller)
 1992: Deepside EP (with Guy Rabiller)
 1993: Tolérance EP
 1994: Volume 1 & 2, as D.S.

Sub System
All produced with Guy Rabiller
 1991: "Subhouse", as Sub System (with Guy Rabiller)
 1991: "J'Ai Peur", as Sub System (with Guy Rabiller)
 1991: "III", as Sub System (with Guy Rabiller)

Other aliases
 1993: Nouveau EP, as Soofle 
 1993: Paris EP, as Choice 
 1993: "Modus Vivendi", as Modus Vivendi
 1993: Inferno EP, as LN'S 
 1993: The Ripost EP, as Deep Contest (with DJ Deep (aka Cyril Étienne des Rosaies))
 1994: "Burning Trash Floor", as Hexagone
 1994: Blanc EP, as Nuages 
 1997: Paris EP (re-release), as Choice

(Co-)Production for other artists
 1993: Orange - Quarter EP
 1993: Shazz - "Lost Illusions"
 1993: Laurent Garnier - A Bout de Souffle EP
 1994: Shazz - "A View of Manhattan..."
 1996: DJ Deep - "Signature"
 2003: Soel - Memento

Remixes
 1993: Aurora Borealis - "Aurora Borealis"
 1993: Suburban Knight - "The Art of Stalking"
 1995: Björk - "Isobel"
 1997: Pierre Henry & Michel Colombier - "Jericho Jerk"
 1999: Boy Gé Mendes - "Cumba Iétu"
 2004: The Pink Panther Theme - (St Germain Remix)
 2014: Gregory Porter - "Musical Genocide (St Germain Remix)"

References

External links
 Official Website
 

French electronic musicians
1969 births
Living people
People from Saint-Germain-en-Laye
Blue Note Records artists
Nonesuch Records artists
House musicians
Nu jazz musicians